"Shock Me" is a single by American sludge metal band, Baroness. The second single off of their fourth studio album, Purple, Shock Me features elements of their traditional sludge metal sound, along with backing synthesizers to create a progressive rock aura. The single was the band's second ever to chart, reaching number 28 on the Billboard Mainstream Rock chart.

"Shock Me" was the band's first, and to date only, song nominated for a Grammy award. Nominated for Grammy Award for Best Metal Performance at the 59th Annual Grammy Awards, the song finished as one of the four runners-up.

Track listing

Charting

Accolades

Grammy Awards

|-
| 2017 || "Shock Me" || Grammy Award for Best Metal Performance || 
|-

References

External links 
Shock Me - Single at Discogs
Shock Me Lyrics at Genius

2015 singles
2015 songs
Baroness (band) songs
Abraxan Hymns singles